The Treaty of Nvarsak (also spelled Nuarsak) was signed between the Armenian rebel leader Vahan Mamikonian and the representatives of the Sasanian King of Kings (shahanshah) Balash at Nvarsak in 484.

Overview
The Nvarsak Treaty was concluded after the previous Sasanian shahanshah Peroz I was killed by the Hephthalites amid Armenian guerrilla efforts. This treaty ensured religious freedom and autonomy for Armenians.

The conditions of the treaty were as follows:
All existing fire-altars in Armenia should be destroyed and no new ones should be constructed.
Christians in Armenia should have freedom of worship and conversions to Zoroastrianism should be stopped.
Land should not be allotted to people who convert to Zoroastrianism
The Sasanian king should, in person, administer Armenia and not through deputies.

Following the treaty, Vahan Mamikonian was appointed as hazarapet and later marzban ("margrave") of Armenia. The Armenian cavalry led by Vahan supported Balash against the uprising of a pretender named Zarer (son or brother of Peroz).

References

Sources
 
 

5th century in Armenia
Peace treaties
484
5th-century treaties
Treaties of Armenia
Treaties of the Sasanian Empire
Christianity in the Sasanian Empire